Katerina Týcová (born 16 May 1999 in Harlaching) is a German professional squash player. As of September 2022, she was ranked number 105 in the world. She won the 2022 Madeira International tournament. She has represented Germany and has been accepted as a squash player into the Bundeswehr.

References

1999 births
Living people
German female squash players
Competitors at the 2022 World Games